Qi Haifeng (born August 7, 1983 in Dalian, Liaoning) is a Chinese decathlete. His personal best in decathlon is 8290 points (achieved in May 2005 in Götzis). He won the decathlon at the national championships in 2009 with a points total of 7729.

Achievements

References

External links

1983 births
Living people
Athletes (track and field) at the 2004 Summer Olympics
Athletes (track and field) at the 2008 Summer Olympics
Chinese decathletes
Olympic athletes of China
Asian Games medalists in athletics (track and field)
Athletes from Dalian
Athletes (track and field) at the 2002 Asian Games
Athletes (track and field) at the 2006 Asian Games
Universiade medalists in athletics (track and field)
Asian Games gold medalists for China
Medalists at the 2002 Asian Games
Universiade bronze medalists for China
Medalists at the 2001 Summer Universiade